John Giles or Gyles may refer to:

Politicians
John Gyles (MP) (died c. 1406), MP for Dover
John Giles (MP fl. 1417–1435), MP for Old Sarum, Marlborough, Calne, Wilton and Devizes
John Giles (died 1553), MP for Totnes
John Giles (died 1606) (c. 1533–1606), MP for Totnes
John Godkin Giles (1834–1903), Ontario medical doctor and political figure
John Giles (mayor) (born 1960), American mayor of Mesa, Arizona

Others

John Gyles (c. 1680–1755), American soldier and interpreter of American-Indian dialects
John Allen Giles (1808–1884), English historian
John Giles (priest) (1812–1867), Archdeacon of Stow from 1862 to 1867
John Giles (architect) (1831–1900), British architect
John K. Giles (1895–1979), American criminal
John Laurent Giles (1901–1969), naval architect
John Giles (athlete) (born 1927), British athlete
Johnny Giles (Michael John Giles; born 1940), Irish footballer, manager and television pundit
John Giles (snooker player) (born 1969), English snooker player